Roy L. Brun (born January 15, 1953) is an American politician who served in the Louisiana House of Representatives as a Republican from 1988 to 1997.

References

Living people
Republican Party members of the Louisiana House of Representatives
1953 births
Louisiana state court judges
Politicians from Shreveport, Louisiana
Louisiana lawyers
Louisiana State University alumni
Louisiana State University Law Center alumni
Fair Park High School alumni